Rolighed may refer to:

 Rolighed (Frederiksberg), a listed house in Frederiksberg, Copenhagen
 Rolighed (Østerbro), a former country house in Østerbro, Copenhagen, associated with Hans Christian Andersen
 Rolighed (Skodsborg), a former country house in Skodsborg, Rudersdal Municipality, north of Copenhagen
 Lille Rolighed, a house in Fredensborg